Boundary changes affecting the English county of Oxfordshire.

See also

Notes
† These areas were entirely detached from the remainder of Buckinghamshire.
‡ Detached part of Oxfordshire surrounded by Buckinghamshire

References

Geography of Oxfordshire
Oxfordshire
History of Oxfordshire
Local government in Oxfordshire
Boundary changes